Sergei Vasilyevich Timofeyev (28 March 1970 – 21 November 1997) was a Russian professional association footballer.

External links
 

1970 births
People from Lyubertsy
1997 deaths
Soviet footballers
Soviet expatriate footballers
Russian footballers
Russian Premier League players
Russian expatriate footballers
Expatriate footballers in Czechoslovakia
Expatriate footballers in Germany
PFC CSKA Moscow players
FC Augsburg players
FC Torpedo Moscow players
FC Torpedo-2 players
FC Spartak Moscow players
Association football midfielders
Association football forwards
FC Lokomotiv Nizhny Novgorod players
FC Znamya Truda Orekhovo-Zuyevo players
Sportspeople from Moscow Oblast